Korean War Veterans Memorial Highway can refer to:
The portion of Interstate 5 in Oregon
The portion of Interstate 70 in Frederick County, Maryland
The portion of Interstate 287 in New Jersey
The portion of U.S. Route 51 in Wisconsin
The toll portion of Delaware Route 1
The portion of California State Route 58 in Kern County
New York State Route 59
The portion of M-82 from Newaygo to Howard City, Michigan

See also
Korean War Veterans Parkway in Staten Island, New York

Korean War memorials and cemeteries
United States in the Korean War